The Coudersport Ice Mine is an ice cave located in Sweden Township, Pennsylvania, (east of Coudersport) that forms icicles in the spring and summer but not in the winter. Ice formations appear in the shaft during the spring of the year, continue through the hot weather, and disappear in winter.

A theory about the origin of this mine states that during the winter, cold air over the hilltop sinks into rock openings in the Lock Haven Formation (Devonian age) and slowly expels the warm air that had penetrated these openings during the preceding summer. Ordinarily this process takes place locally, but here the interconnection of the rock crevices tends to be so arranged that the air circulation over a wide region is focused on one spot. Thus, from April or May to September, cold air comes in contact with percolating groundwater, forming ice during the hot months of the year; from September to late spring, warm air trapped in the rocks from the preceding summer escapes and melts the ice.

The cave was open to the public for many decades but closed in 1990. 

The ice mine property was purchased by new owners who began a restoration in 2013. After being closed for nearly a quarter of a century, the Coudersport Ice Mine was re-opened in 2014.

References

External links 
 Coudersport Ice Mine at www.showcaves.com
 Coudersport Ice Mine at www.roadsideamerica.com
 Popular Science Article on Ice Mine
 Popular Science Article on Ice Mine Page 2

Caves of Pennsylvania
Ice caves
Landforms of Potter County, Pennsylvania